Black Box is the fifth studio album by South Korean girl group Brown Eyed Girls. The album was released on July 29, 2013. The song "Recipe" was released on July 9 as a digital single. The song "Kill Bill" was used as the promotional song.

Concept
The name Black Box was used for the album since it is an album that recorded their journey just like a black box records things. Just like their teaser photos, they tried to ditch their strong image for a lighter and more feminine image. Title track "Kill Bill" has taken from Quentin Tarantino's film of the same name as a motif, which is about the revenge on a playboy. According to Jea, "The whistle in the intro of the song reminded me of the movie Kill Bill. Members said that it would a good idea so we filmed the music video as the homage to the movie and made the clothing have the mood of western dramas."

Promotions
Brown Eyed Girls pre-released the song Recipe as a buzz single for their album. They released teaser pics announcing their full scale comeback in two years. The group made their first stage for their title track "Kill Bill" on July 28 on SBS's Inkigayo along with their pre-released track "Recipe". They dropped their fifth album and the MV the day after.

Track listing

Release history

References

External links 
 
 

2013 albums
Korean-language albums
Kakao M albums
Brown Eyed Girls albums

ko:BLACK BOX